James Crotty may refer to: 
 James Crotty (economist) (born 1940), American economist
 James Crotty (prospector) (1845–1898), Irish-born mining prospector in Tasmania
 Jim Crotty (1938–2021), American football cornerback